Léopold Roosemont (15 May 1909 – 21 February 1963) was a Belgian racing cyclist. He rode in the 1933 Tour de France.

References

1909 births
1963 deaths
Belgian male cyclists
Place of birth missing